Desmond Ferguson (1930 – 2 November 2021) was a Gaelic footballer who played for the Dublin county team. He played his club football and with St Vincents. He won the All-Ireland Senior Football Championship with Dublin in 1958 and 1963. He moved to Meath and began playing with Gaeil Colmcille winning Meath Senior Football Championship titles with them in 1966 and 1968.

His death was announced on 2 November 2021.

Honours

Gaeil Cholmcille
Meath Senior Football Championship: 1966, 1968

Dublin
All-Ireland Senior Football Championship: 1958, 1963
Leinster Senior Football Championship: 1955, 1958, 1959, 1963
Leinster Senior Hurling Championship: 1952, 1961
National Football League: 1952–53, 1954–55, 1957–58
Leinster Minor Football Championship: 1948
Dublin Senior Football Championship: 1949, 1950, 1951, 1952, 1953, 1954,1955, 1957, 1958, 1959, 1960, 1961, 1962, 1963, 1964, 1966 & 1967
Dublin Senior Hurling Championship: 1953, 1954. 1955, 1957, 1960, 1962, 1964 & 1967

References

1930 births
2021 deaths
Dual players
Irish schoolteachers
People educated at St. Joseph's CBS, Fairview
St Vincents (Dublin) Gaelic footballers
St Vincents (Dublin) hurlers
Dublin inter-county Gaelic footballers
Dublin inter-county hurlers
Leinster inter-provincial hurlers
Leinster inter-provincial Gaelic footballers
Gaelic football selectors
Gaelic football coaches
Hurling coaches